Bovolone is a town and a comune (municipality) in the Province of Verona in the Italian region Veneto, located about  west of Venice and about  southeast of Verona.

Bovolone borders the following municipalities: Cerea, Concamarise, Isola della Scala, Isola Rizza, Oppeano, Salizzole, and San Pietro di Morubio.

Notabable people 

 Rino Passigato, Archibishop of the Catholic Church, who was the Apostolic Nuncio from 1991 to 2008.

Twin towns
 Stadecken-Elsheim, Germany, since 2000
 Sinnai, Italy, since 2002

References

External links
 www.bovolone.net/

Cities and towns in Veneto